"Lady Melody" is a 2009 song recorded by French singer-songwriter Tom Frager with his group Gwayav'. It is his debut single from his 2008 album Better Days. The promotional CD was sent to the radio in the first days of August and was much aired on radio, becoming a summer hit, then was released physically in early September 2009.

The song achieved success in France where it reached number-one, both on the singles and digital charts, respectively for four and two weeks. On the physical chart, it remained for 17 weeks in the top ten and 34 weeks in the top 100. However, the song was a relative failure in Belgium and Switzerland.

According to Frager, the song was aired on radio before he found a label for the album. He thought the song would be popular, but he did not expect such success. The song, composed in his room, deals with the music and is simple and is for everybody. Although the title is in English, lyrics are in French.

Charts

Peak positions

Year-end charts

References

Tom Frager songs
SNEP Top Singles number-one singles
2009 songs
2009 debut singles